Fluor may refer to:

 Fluor, the name in several European languages of the chemical element Fluorine
Fluor Corporation, multinational engineering and construction firm.
Fluorite, a class of minerals
 Fluorophore, a fluorescent chemical compound

See also
Flour (disambiguation)
Fleur (disambiguation)